Dallier is a French surname. Notable people with the surname include:

Henri Dallier (1849–1934), French classical organist
Philippe Dallier (born 1962), French politician
Roger Dallier (1919–1993), French film director

French-language surnames